Othman Slimani (October 13, 1941 in Fez, Morocco - April 2, 2004 in Morocco) was a Moroccan economist and banker.

Slimani came from a modest background, but being a bright student allowed him to attend French-speaking schools in Morocco, and later obtain a scholarship to study in France. After earning a degree in economics at a French university he returned to Morocco and worked in the Ministry of Economics. From 1977 to 1979 he served as minister of economics in the cabinet of Ahmed Osman. After Osman left office, Slimani became the president of the CIH Bank (Crédit immobilier et hôtelier), and led the bank until 1993, when he was fired after a finance scandal. In 2002 he was indicted for embezzlement and misappropriation of public funds together with 32 former CIH colleagues, and subsequently jailed for four months. Released on bail, he died in 2004 of lung cancer without his legal case reaching a conclusion. Six years after his death, in 2010, Slimani was posthumously exonerated, all charges were dropped and an official apology for his ordeals was issued.

Slimani was married to an otorhinolaryngologist; one of his three daughters is the French-Moroccan writer Leïla Slimani.

References 

1941 births
2004 deaths
Government ministers of Morocco
Moroccan economists